Wurmberg is a municipality in the district of Enz in Baden-Württemberg in Germany.

Geography

Wurmberg is located on the so-called Platte, a Karst mountain range in the northern Black Forest (Schwarzwald).

Municipality

The municipality Wurmberg includes the districts Wurmberg and Neubärental.  Wurmberg was a settlement of the Waldensians from Lucerne.

History

Wurmberg was first mentioned in documents in 1221 as a chapel was built at that time. In the following period, the Maulbronn Monastery secured the rule of Wurmberg.  The monastery of Wurmberg came into Württemberg in 1504 following the Bavarian-Palatine War of Succession.  At the end of the 17th Century Waldensian Protestants forced to flee from Italy settled in Wurmberg.  The establishment of the district of Neubärental in 1721 goes back to these religious refugees.  An originating theologian of Bärenthal (Hohenzollern) who had converted with some families from Catholicism to Protestantism, had to leave his home in the southern German town of Bärenthal.

Religion
In 1534, Ulrich, Duke of Württemberg enforced the Protestant Reformation in his Duchy of Württemberg.
Waldensians immigrants had found refuge in Wurmberg-Lucerne.
40 people form Bärenthal in Hohenzollern had found refuge in Wurmberg-Neubärental.

Population growth
The population figures for the respective area of jurisdiction are estimates, census results (¹) or official updates of the State Statistical Office Baden-Württemberg (only primary residences ).

Economy and infrastructure

The nearest railway station is Pforzheim main station, located about 10 km west of Wurmberg.  Even closer to the breakpoint is Niefern on the route Pforzheim Mühlacker. Bus lines 739, 761, 763 and 769 of the Verkehrsverbund Pforzheim-Enzkreis connect Wurmberg with Pforzheim.

Education

Wurmberg has its own primary school.

External links

Official Website

References

Enzkreis
Württemberg